"Whodunit", written by Keni St. Lewis and Freddie Perren, was a hit song for American R&B/disco group Tavares in 1977. Released from their album Love Storm.

Background
The lyrical hook to the song was the repeated query "Whodunit? / Who stole my baby?" The singer then appealed to a series of famous fictional detectives to help "solve" the case, including Sherlock Holmes, Charlie Chan, Ellery Queen, McCloud, Kojak, Baretta and Dirty Harry. The gimmick was reminiscent of "Searchin'", a 1957 single by The Coasters which also invoked a series of lawmen to track down a missing love interest.

Chart performance
The song spent one week at number one on the R&B singles chart in May 1977 and peaked at number twenty-two on the Billboard Hot 100 singles chart and in the UK peaked at number 5 the week ending 7 May 1977, where it stayed for 2 weeks. "Whodunit" was re-released in February 1986.

Weekly singles charts

Year-end charts

References

External links
 

1977 songs
1977 singles
Capitol Records singles
Tavares (group) songs
European Hot 100 Singles number-one singles
Songs written by Freddie Perren
Soul songs
Songs written by Keni St. Lewis